Hwal or Hoal (Korean for the weapon "bow") may refer to:
 Korean bow
 The Bow (film)